Annika Strandhäll (born 30 April 1975) is a Swedish trade unionist and politician of the Social Democrats. She served as Minister for Climate and the Environment from 2021 to 2022. She also served as Minister for Social Security from 2014 until her resignation in 2019, following her partner's death a month earlier. She previously held the office of Minister for Social Affairs from 2017 to 2019. and acting Minister for Public Health, Healthcare and Sports, during Gabriel Wikström's sick leave, from May to July 2017.

Resignation 
On 30 September 2019, following the death of her partner, Strandhäll announced that she would be resigning from her post as Minister for Social Security. In February 2020, Strandhäll spoke publicly in a television interview and on Facebook about her partner Thomas Wolf, the father of her two children, having committed suicide after their separation. Wolf had been a high-ranking officer at the government-run insurance agency. Strandhäll said that although she had known he was suffering from depression already prior to their separation, she had not realised the gravity of the situation. She told newspaper Expressen that she intended to remain in politics as an MP, but that her new situation with full responsibility for the children was going to have an impact on any future commitments. Strandhäll said that she spoke publicly about Wolf's passing in order to end speculation about the cause of the tragedy and that it was the right time after several months of grief.

References

|-

|-

|-

|-

|-

|-

|-

1975 births
Swedish trade unionists
Living people
Swedish Ministers for Social Security
Swedish Ministers for Health
Swedish Ministers for Social Affairs
Members of the Riksdag 2018–2022
Members of the Riksdag from the Social Democrats
Women government ministers of Sweden
Swedish Ministers for the Environment
Members of the Riksdag 2022–2026
Women members of the Riksdag
21st-century Swedish women politicians